Daphne Kalotay is a novelist and short story writer who lives in Somerville, Massachusetts. She is known for her novels, Russian Winter (Harper, 2010) and Sight Reading (Harper, 2013), and her collection of short stories, Calamity and Other Stories (Doubleday, 2005), which was short listed for the 2005 Story Prize.  She is a graduate of Vassar College and holds an MA in creative writing and a PhD in literature from Boston University, where she has also taught. In addition, she has  taught at Middlebury College and been a writer-in-residence at Skidmore College and Lynchburg College. From 2014-16 she was the Visiting Writer in English at University of Massachusetts, Boston. She is a citizen of both the United States and Canada. She is currently a lecturer at Princeton University.

Biography 
Kalotay was raised in Madison, New Jersey and attended Vassar College.  In 1993, she moved to Brookline, Massachusetts to attend Boston University's Masters Program in Creative Writing and remained at Boston University to complete a PhD in Modern and Contemporary Literature at the now-defunct University Professors Program.  Studying under her advisor Saul Bellow, she wrote a dissertation on the Canadian writer Mavis Gallant and graduated in 1998.

In 1999, she moved to Vermont for a term position at Middlebury College, where she taught for the English department.  She return to Massachusetts in 2002 and since then has lived in the Boston area. From 2012-2014, she served as co-president of the Women's National Book Association's Boston chapter. In 2017, her short story  "Relativity" was the One City/One Story Boston selection.

Critical acclaim 
Kalotay has received numerous awards for her fiction, including the 2011 Writers' League of Texas Fiction Prize  for her novel Russian Winter  and the  Florence Engel Randall Fiction Prize and a Transatlantic Review Award from The Henfield Foundation.

Her novel Sight Reading won the 2014 New England Society Book Award  and was a finalist for the 2014 Paterson Fiction Prize.

She has been awarded fellowships from the Christopher Isherwood Foundation, the MacDowell Colony, the Bogliasco Foundation, and Yaddo. Her short fiction collection, Calamity and Other Stories, was shortlisted for the 2005 Story Prize. Her work has been reviewed in the New York Times, the New Yorker, Washington Post, The Guardian, The Rumpus, the Boston Globe, the Philadelphia Inquirer, O Magazine, The Oregonian, Good Housekeeping, USA Today and dozens of other publications.

Bibliography

Books 
Sight Reading: A Novel (Harper, 2013) 
Russian Winter: A Novel (Harper, 2010) 
Calamity and Other Stories (Doubleday, 2005) 
Blue Hours  (Northwestern University Press, 2019)

Short fiction
 "Awake" in Memorious 26, June 2016
"Russian Winter: A Story" in Fusion: A Global Forum, Volume 3, Issue #1, 2012
"What Madame Lipsky Wanted" in Good Housekeeping, January 2005
"All Life's Grandeur" in Prairie Schooner, Summer 2004
"Calamity" in AGNI online, July 2003 
"The Man from Allston Electric" in AGNI no. 55, 2002 
"Seeing" in Missouri Review, vol. xxiv, no.2, 2001
"Serenade" in Missouri Review, vol. xxiii, 2000
"Sunshine Cleaners" in Michigan Quarterly Review, vol. xxxix, no. 1, Winter 2000
"Snapshots" in The Literary Review, vol. 42, no. 4, Summer 1999
"The Business of Love" in Virginia Quarterly Review, vol. 75, no. 2, Spring 1999
"Alabaster Doesn't Count" in Bellowing Ark, September/October 1996

Essays
"The Calm Before the Calm: Silence and the Creative Writer," Poets & Writers, May/June 2013, p. 37-39.
"The Art of Reading Gina Berriault," Poets & Writers, Sept/Oct 2012, p. 33-39.
"Biography of a Novel," Fusion: A Global Forum, Volume 3, Issue # 1, 2012, p. 186-88.
"The Other Daphne: Du Maurier's Short Stories," Memorious.org, Sept. 7, 2010
"Narration and 'Psychic Distance'" in Now Write! (Penguin 2006) pp. 78–81, S. Ellis, ed.
"Recommendation: the Stories of Gina Berriault ," Post Road 11, Fall 2005, pp. 31–32.
Mavis Gallant interview, The Art of Fiction no. 160, Paris Review #153, Winter 1999

Book Reviews
 "Essays" New York Times Sunday Book Review 2016
 "Was It Any Use? Donal Ryan's 'Spinning Heart'"  New York Times Sunday Book Review 2014
"The Kids Are Alright" on a novel by Sarah Braunstein, Tottenville Review  #4, 2011
"Journey to the Center of a Character" on a novella by Tony Tulathimutte, Tottenville Review  #3, 2011
"All That Work and Still No Boys" on a story collection by Kathryn Ma,  Tottenville Review  #2, 2010
"The Delighted States" on a nonfiction book by Adam Thirlwell, Tottenville Review  #1, 2010
"The Poetry of a Translation" review of poetry by Marcello Fabbri, Vassar Quarterly Summer, 1996
"Exploring the Bear Essentials in Oregon" review of The Bear Essential, Vassar Quarterly, Winter 1995

Poetry Translation
Partisan Review:  translations from the Hungarian of poems by Attila Jozsef (vol. lxiii, no. 3, Summer 1996)

Interviews
 An interview with Daphne Kalotay, 2020
 Daphne Kalotay on Female Friendships in Literature and Life, 2020
 Daphne Kalotay on American Intervention in Afghanistan and Civilian Responsibility, 2019
 In Life And Work, War Is Personal For Author Daphne Kalotay, 2019
 Daphne Kalotay Blue Hours, 2019
 The Significance of Ordinary Lives: An Interview with Daphne Kalotay, 2019
 'Blue Hours' by Daphne Kalotay , 2019
 Daphne Kalotay with Caroline Leavitt, 2019
 Two coming-of-age stories in one, 2019
 Fiction Spotlight: Daphne Kalotay, 2019

References

External links 

21st-century American novelists
21st-century Canadian novelists
American women short story writers
Living people
Vassar College alumni
Boston University College of Arts and Sciences alumni
Canadian women short story writers
American women novelists
Canadian women novelists
21st-century Canadian women writers
21st-century Canadian short story writers
21st-century American short story writers
Year of birth missing (living people)
People from Madison, New Jersey
21st-century American women writers